Ballay is a commune in the Ardennes department in the Grand Est region of northern France.

The inhabitants of the commune are known as Ballayriots or Ballayriottes.

Geography
Ballay is located some 35 km east by south-east of Rethel and 3 km north of Vouziers. Access to the commune is by the D977 road from Vouziers which passes through the centre of the commune and the village and continues north to Quatre-Champs. The D19 road from Quatre-Champs to Vandy forms part of the northern border of the commune. Apart from the village there are the hamlets of Claire-Fontaine, Landèves, and La Noue Adam. The commune is mostly forested in the east and west with farmland down the centre.

The Aisne river forms the south-western border of the commune as it flows north to eventually join the Oise at Clairoix. The Fournelles flows through the centre of the commune from the north and joins the Aisne on the south-western border. Several tributaries rise in the commune and feed the Fournelles including the Martignère, the Ruisseau du Moulin des Bois, and the Chalan which forms part of the southern border of the commune.

Clairefontaine and Landèves were municipalities in 1790 and merged into Ballay at the end of 1790.

Neighbouring communes and villages

History
In the 12th century Ballay was a lordship with a castle and a parish with a church dedicated to Notre-Dame which was an annex to Vandy. An Augustinian Priory, Notre-Dame of Landèves, was founded at Landèves in 1219 by two brother lords of Bally who made it religious. Since its foundation the priory served the parish of Ballay. The priory became an abbey in 1623. The abbey and church were destroyed during the French Revolution.

Administration

List of Successive Mayors

Demography
In 2017 the commune had 289 inhabitants.

Sites and monuments

The Town Hall/School at Rue Notre-Dame (1925)
The Church of Notre-Dame at Rue Notre-Dame (1925)
A Flour Mill at Landèves (1921) The Flour Mill contains several items that are registered as historical objects:
A Separator Machine (20th century)
A Grinding Machine (20th century)
A Cleaning Machine (20th century)
An Ossberger Hydraulic Turbine (1922)

See also
Communes of the Ardennes department

External links
Ballay on the old National Geographic Institute website 
Ballay on Géoportail, National Geographic Institute (IGN) website 
Balay on the 1750 Cassini Map

References

Communes of Ardennes (department)